Webster Wright (born March 19, 1967) is an American sports shooter. He competed in the men's 50 metre rifle prone event at the 1988 Summer Olympics.

References

External links
 

1967 births
Living people
American male sport shooters
Olympic shooters of the United States
Shooters at the 1988 Summer Olympics
Sportspeople from Annapolis, Maryland
Pan American Games medalists in shooting
Pan American Games gold medalists for the United States
Pan American Games silver medalists for the United States
Pan American Games bronze medalists for the United States
Shooters at the 1987 Pan American Games
Shooters at the 1995 Pan American Games
Medalists at the 1995 Pan American Games
20th-century American people
21st-century American people